David A. Armstrong is an American cinematographer, film producer and director, who was involved in a number of short films and low budget horror films. Although best known for his work on the first six installments of the Saw franchise, Armstrong has also directed two films, the crime thrillers Pawn  and The Assassin's Code.

Life and career 
Having a Master of Fine Arts in cinematography from the American Film Institute, and a Bachelor of Fine Arts from California Institute of the Arts, Armstrong began his career as the cinematographer of an unreleased 1986 film, Norman and God. Shortly after, he shot a series of independent B-movies and short films. In 2004, Armstrong was hired by James Wan and Leigh Whannell to film the first installment of the Saw franchise. He also served as cinematographer for the next five films, namely Saw II, Saw III, Saw IV, Saw V, and Saw VI. Armstrong went on to shoot other low budget independent horror films including Sam's Lake, Skinwalkers, and The Gravedancers (all 2006). In 2009, Armstrong served as director of photography for the crime thrillers The Lodger and 2:13, as well the action-comedy Next Day Air. Armstrong's latest efforts as cinematographer are Dead Awake (2010), Hellraiser: Revelations, and On the Inside (both 2011).

Armstrong made his directorial debut with the action film Pawn (2013), starring Michael Chiklis, Ray Liotta, Common, Stephen Lang and Forest Whitaker. The independent film was shot in only 15 days and was released straight-to-DVD.

Armstrong directed his second feature, the crime thriller The Assassin's Code (2018), starring Justin Chatwin, Peter Stormare, and Mark Thompson. Having its world premiere at the 42nd Cleveland International Film Festival, the film was released through video on demand platforms by Gravitas Ventures.

Filmography

As cinematographer

As producer

As director

References

External links 

Living people
Year of birth missing (living people)
American cinematographers
Film directors from Los Angeles
American film producers
Film producers from California